Jae-Yeon Won (born 22 February 1988) is a South Korean pianist. He won the second prize and the audience prize at the 61st Ferruccio Busoni International Piano Competition in 2017 and was a laureate at the Long-Thibaud-Crespin Competition in  2012.

He embarked on a series of concerts internationally, including Herkulessaal-Munich, Beethoven Haus-Bonn, Alte Aula-Heidelberg, Berlin Philharmonie-Berlin, Wiener Saal in Salzburg, Salle Cortot, Salle Gaveau, Opera Comique-Paris, Palacio de Opera-Coruna, Auditorio de Ferrol, Teatro Ricardo Castro in Durango, Seoul Art Center and Lotte concert hall-Seoul, etc.

Performances with Orchestras include Orchestre Philharmonique de Radio France, Seoul Philharmonic Orchestra, KBS symphony orchestra, Korean symphony orchestra, Westsächsischen symphonie orchester, Bari Symphony Orchestra, Leipizg Musikhochschule orchester, Orquestra Sinfonica de Galicia, Quartetto di Cremona and Das Haydn-Orchestra. Also his live performances have been broadcast by France Musique, RAI  in  Italy, ORF in Austria, BR-Klassik in Germany and as well as KBS, MBC and SBS in Korea.

Recordings 
 2020 – Bach to Bartok: F. Liszt Apparition No. 1, J. S. Bach aria variata in a minor BWV 989, B. Bartok "Out of doors" sz. 81, etc. – Acousence Classics

References

External links 
 Concours International Lauréats  from the Long-Thibaud-Crespin Competition 

1988 births
Living people
21st-century male musicians
Long-Thibaud-Crespin Competition prize-winners
Male classical pianists
Musicians from Seoul
Prize-winners of the Ferruccio Busoni International Piano Competition
South Korean classical pianists
South Korean expatriates in Germany